The V-League 2nd Season, 1st Conference is a tournament of the Shakey's V-League. The tournament was held from May 14, 2005 until the final game on July, 2005.

Tournament Format
Double Round Robin Tournament
Top four teams will compete in the semi-finals
Semi-Finals is also double round robin
Best of Three Championship series

Final standings

Starting Line-ups

Eliminations

Semi-finals

Shakey's V-League conferences
2005 in Philippine sport
2005 in volleyball